The women's half marathon event  at the 2007 All-Africa Games was held on July 19.

Results

References
Results

Half marathon
Half marathons